Sonde is either of two Bantu languages of the Democratic Republic of the Congo. Maho (2009) classifies Sonde–Kisoonde as closest to Suku, but lists an adjacent language also called Sonde as closer to Pende. These are not distinguished in Ethnologue or by ISO code.

References

Yaka languages
Languages of the Democratic Republic of the Congo